Martin "Bassic" Lindhe (born 20 January 1971, Borås, Sweden) is a Swedish musician and composer, with a style that blends electronica, ambient and dance. His music is often progressive and suggestive in nature. He is best known for his string of hits on the music website mp3.com, where he during a period of almost two years he was one of the most downloaded artists in the genres electronica, new age, mood music and progressive trance. He moved to the United States in 1999. In 2020, his family lost their house in Boulder Creek, California to the 2020 California wildfires and is as of February 2021 living in a rented house. Lindhe is the great-grandchild of the Swedish composer Wilhelm Stenhammar.

Career

19911999: Early career 
During his early years Bassic composed a flurry of songs, mostly using borrowed equipment. No music was published until after 1999, and many of these old recordings from this period were lost.

19992002: MP3.com years 
He originally uploaded his tracks to MP3.com in the 1990s as a storage solution while moving from Sweden to the USA. Soon after, he was noticed by electronica lovers and gained a large following on MP3.com. By the time the service had been taken over by CNET, his tracks had been downloaded over 7 million times.

20022004: Independent years 
During this period Lindhe mainly focused on his family and only released a collection of his most popular songs, with some new material, Daydreamer from his own private website. In 2002 Lindhe was nominated for Best Unsigned Artist and Yahoo! Internet Life's "Internet Music Awards" in New York City.

20042007: DMI years 
After noticing Lindhe's success at MP3.com, Digital Musicworks International persuaded Lindhe to join their roster.  After signing with DMI, Lindhe composed and released Brighter Than the Sun, one of his most appreciated and best-selling releases to date.  In 2007, Lindhe left DMI claiming they had failed to fulfill their contract with him.

2007present: Independent years 
Since 2007 Lindhe has been an independent publisher of his own music through iTunes Store, eMusic, Amazon MP3 and Bandcamp.

Discography 

The Complete Chronicles (Vol. 1-6) (1991-2003)
Daydreamer (2005)
Brighter Than The Sun (2006)
Omniom (2009)
Voco (2015)
Motus (2015)
Biochrome (2017)

Recording 
Lindhe has self-recorded and produced all of his albums, and played all instruments that appear on them. Since 2006, he has exclusively made music using a high-end computer studio with software synthesizers and samplers.

Licensing 
Bassic songs have been licensed for commercial use with companies like Jovan Musk, Microsoft, The History Channel, U.S. Army and the Canadian game company BioWare.

References

External links 
 

Living people
Electronica musicians
Swedish male musicians
1971 births